Terry Barratt (born 23 February 1971) is a former English cricketer.  Barratt was a left-handed batsman who bowled right-arm medium-fast.  He was born at Rothwell, Northamptonshire.

Barratt represented the Northamptonshire Cricket Board in a single List A match against Northamptonshire in the 2001 Cheltenham & Gloucester Trophy.

References

External links
Terry Barratt at Cricinfo
Terry Barratt at CricketArchive

1971 births
Living people
People from Rothwell, Northamptonshire
English cricketers
Northamptonshire Cricket Board cricketers